Calcium hydride is the chemical compound with the formula , and is therefore an alkaline earth hydride. This grey powder (white if pure, which is rare) reacts vigorously with water liberating hydrogen gas.  is thus used as a drying agent, i.e. a desiccant.

 is a saline hydride, meaning that its structure is salt-like. The alkali metals and the alkaline earth metals heavier than beryllium all form saline hydrides. A well-known example is sodium hydride, which crystallizes in the NaCl motif.

Preparation
Calcium hydride is prepared from its elements by direct combination of calcium and hydrogen at 300 to 400 °C.

Uses

Reduction of metal oxides
 is a reducing agent for the production of metal from the metal oxides of Ti, V, Nb, Ta, and U. It is proposed to operate via its decomposition to Ca metal:

Hydrogen source
 has been used for hydrogen production. In the 1940s, it was available under the trade name "Hydrolith" as a source of hydrogen:'The trade name for this compound is "hydrolith"; in cases of emergency, it can be used as a portable source of hydrogen, for filling airships. It is rather expensive for this use.'The reference to "emergency" probably refers to wartime use. The compound has, however, been widely used for decades as a safe and convenient means to inflate weather balloons. Likewise, it is regularly used in laboratories to produce small quantities of highly pure hydrogen for experiments. The moisture content of diesel fuel is estimated by the hydrogen evolved upon treatment with CaH2.

Desiccant

Calcium hydride is a relatively mild desiccant and, compared to molecular sieves, probably inefficient. Its use is safer than more reactive agents such as sodium metal or sodium-potassium alloy. Calcium hydride is widely used as a desiccant for basic solvents such as amines and pyridine. It is also used to dry alcohols.

Despite its convenience,  has a few drawbacks:

History
During the Battle of the Atlantic, German submarines used calcium hydride as a sonar decoy called bold.

Other calcium hydrides
Although the term calcium hydride almost always refers to CaH2, a number of molecular hydrides of calcium are known.  One example is (Ca(μ-H)(thf)(nacnac)2.

See also
 Calcium monohydride

References

Metal hydrides
Calcium compounds
Desiccants
Hydrogen storage